Kings is a 2007 Irish film written & directed by Tom Collins and based on  Jimmy Murphy's play The Kings of the Kilburn High Road. The film is bilingual, having both Irish and English dialogue. It premiered at the Taormina Film Festival (Italy) in June 2007, and was selected as Ireland's official entry for the 2008 Academy Awards in the best foreign-language film category. The film tells the story of a group of Irish friends who, after emigrating to England 30 years previously, meet for the funeral of a friend. In 2008, the Irish postal service, An Post, issued a series of stamps honouring the Irish film industry. Colm Meaney, as Joe Mullan, was featured on the 55 cent stamp.

Plot
In the mid-1970s a group of young men leave the Connemara Gaeltacht, bound for London and filled with ambition for a better life. After thirty years, they meet again at the funeral of their youngest friend, Jackie. The film intersperses flashbacks of a lost youth in Ireland with the harsh realities of modern life.

For some the thirty years has been hard, working in building sites across Britain. Slowly the truth about Jackie's death become clear and the friends discover they need each other more than ever. However, by the end, the friends split up for good, going their separate ways.

Cast

Awards 
In 2007, Tom Collins won the Directors Guild of America / Ireland New Finders Award. The film itself was nominated for a record 14 Irish Film and Television Awards (IFTAs) in 2008, – going on to win 5 IFTAs, including Best Irish Language Film

IFTA Awards (2008)-

Won –

Best Actor in a Supporting Role in a Feature Film – Brendan Conroy
Best Editing – Dermot Diskin
Best Original Score – Pol Brennan
Best Sound – Ken Galvin, Ronan Hill, Dominic Weaver
Special Irish Language Award

Nominated –

Best Actor in a Lead Role in a Feature Film – Colm Meaney
Best Actor in a Supporting Role in a Feature Film – Donal O'Kelly
Best Costume Design – Maggie Donnelly
Best Director of Photography – P.J. Dillon
Best Hair & Make-Up – Muriel Bell, Pamela Smyth
Best Production Design – David Craig
Best Director for Film – Tom Collins
Best Script for Film – Tom Collins
Best Film – Jackie Larkin, Tom Collins

References

External links 
 
 

2007 films
Irish-language films
2007 drama films
Irish drama films
English-language Irish films